The 1990 Miller Genuine Draft 400 was a NASCAR Winston Cup Series race that took place on September 9, 1990, at Richmond International Raceway in Richmond, Virginia. This race spanned  on a permanent oval track.

This was the last fall day race at Richmond until rain postponed the 2008 event to Sunday.

Background
In 1953, Richmond International Raceway began hosting the Grand National Series with Lee Petty winning that first race in Richmond.  The original track was paved in 1968.  In 1988, the track was re-designed into its present D-shaped configuration

The name for the raceway complex was "Strawberry Hill" until the Virginia State Fairgrounds site was bought out in 1999 and renamed the "Richmond International Raceway".

Race report
There was a starting grid of 36 American-born drivers; J.D. McDuffie, Jack Pennington, and Kerry Teague failed to qualify for this race. Rob Moroso, Greg Sacks, and Derrike Cope had to start at the back of the field because of going to backup cars after crashing in practice. Harry Gant was credited as the last-place finisher after an engine failure at lap 12 of this 400-lap racing event. Jimmy Spencer was the last driver to finish the race; being 82 laps off the lead lap. Dale Earnhardt would defeat Mark Martin by 0.90 seconds in this three-hour race. Earnhardt's victory made him the first driver to win at Richmond on both the traditional layout and the contemporary layout.

This race was Darrell Waltrip's first race back after the injuries he suffered at 1990 Pepsi 400.

Chad Little hit the wall hard; forcing him out of the race after recording 239 laps. Brett Bodine also crashed into the wall around that time.  There was a red flag for about 30 minutes after the Jarrett/Moroso crash because Jarrett plowed into the inside retaining wall, which was still made of the old boiler plate at the time. Crews had to repair the wall as Jarrett put a good dent into it.

Mark Martin was the fastest car toward the end of the race, after pitting for a splash and go to ensure he'd finish the race with enough fuel. He was tearing through the field up until the final restart. Earnhardt restarted first and Martin second, in the running order. NASCAR officials gave the one-to-go with 5 laps to go, and cars were three-wide trying to figure out where to restart, including the lapped cars. NASCAR did not wave off the restart; instead, they waved the green with four to go, and Earnhardt not only obviously jumped the start but the lapped and damaged #12 car being driven by Harry Gant in relief of Hut Stricklin was between the 3 and 6 in the outside lane. The only action that was taken because of this was the #12 was moved to the bottom car one lap down, instead of the first car one lap down.

Several accidents and debris caused nine caution flags. Meanwhile, Rusty Wallace and Dale Earnhardt were showing off some fantastic side-by-side racing during the final 100 laps. Mark Martin briefly gained the lead on lap 347 but his racing skill was not enough to hold back Dale Earnhardt; who took back the lead on lap 376. Ernie Irvan, Alan Kulwicki, Mark Martin, and Ken Schrader would duke it out for supremacy during the opening 101 laps of the event.

This was apparently Barry Dodson's last race as the crew chief for Rusty Wallace. Blue Max Racing was shutting down at the end of 1990, so Dodson left to work on building Team III Racing that he led in 1991.

Ron Esau would retire from the NASCAR Cup Series after this race. Earnhardt would walk away from this race taking home $59,225 ($ when adjusted for inflation) while Harry Gant had to take home $8,855 ($ when adjusted for inflation).

Top 10 finishers

Timeline
Section reference: 
 Start of race: Ernie Irvan started the race with the pole position.
 Lap 10: Caution due to Rusty Wallace spinning his vehicle into turn two, ended on lap 11.
 Lap 12: Harry Gant noticed his engine reacted in an adverse manner, making him the last-place finisher.
 Lap 33: Caution due to Jimmy Spencer's accident, ended on lap 35.
 Lap 34: Alan Kulwicki took over the lead from Ernie Irvan.
 Lap 77: Mark Martin took over the lead from Alan Kulwicki.
 Lap 102: Ken Schrader took over the lead from Mark Martin.
 Lap 120: Derrike Cope witnessed his engine acting strangely.
 Lap 123: Caution due to Derrike Cope's engine problems, ended on lap 128.
 Lap 147: Caution due to a four-car accident, ended on lap 156.
 Lap 161: Mickey Gibbs had a terminal crash, forcing him to leave the race early.
 Lap 164: Dale Earnhardt took over the lead from Rusty Wallace.
 Lap 185: D.K. Ulrich saw his engine acting weird, forcing him to exit the event.
 Lap 236: Caution for debris throughout the track, ended on lap 240.
 Lap 237: Rusty Wallace took over the lead from Dale Earnhardt.
 Lap 239: Chad Little had a terminal crash, ending his race weekend prematurely.
 Lap 241: Dale Earnhardt took over the lead from Rusty Wallace.
 Lap 245: Brett Bodine had a terminal crash along with four other drivers, causing him to retire to the pits.
 Lap 270: Morgan Shepherd's engine died down on this lap, ending his hopes for a respectable finish.
 Lap 276: Rob Moroso and Dale Jarrett had a terminal crash, making him the final DNF for the race.
 Lap 277: Rusty Wallace took over the lead from Dale Earnhardt.
 Lap 288: Dale Earnhardt took over the lead from Rusty Wallace.
 Lap 304: Rusty Wallace took over the lead from Dale Earnhardt.
 Lap 305: Dale Earnhardt took over the lead from Rusty Wallace.
 Lap 311: Rusty Wallace took over the lead from Dale Earnhardt.
 Lap 312: Dale Earnhardt took over the lead from Rusty Wallace.
 Lap 329: Rusty Wallace took over the lead from Dale Earnhardt.
 Lap 347: Mark Martin took over the lead from Rusty Wallace.
 Lap 376: Dale Earnhardt took over the lead from Mark Martin.
 Lap 396: Caution due to Ernie Irvan spinning his vehicle into turn four, ended on lap 397.
 Finish: Dale Earnhardt was officially declared the winner of the event.

Standings after the race

References

Miller Genuine Draft 400 (September)
Miller Genuine Draft 400 (September)
NASCAR races at Richmond Raceway